Rudaux is an impact crater in the Ismenius Lacus quadrangle of Mars, located at 38.3°N latitude and 309.1°W  longitude. It measures  in diameter and was named after the French artist and astronomer Lucien Rudaux. The naming was approved by the IAU's Working Group for Planetary System Nomenclature in 1973.

Interactive Mars map

See also
 Climate of Mars
 Geology of Mars
 Impact crater
 List of craters on Mars

References 

Ismenius Lacus quadrangle
Impact craters on Mars